McIver and MacIver are Scottish and Northern Irish surnames. The names are derived from the Gaelic Mac Íomhair, meaning "‘son of Íomhar". The Gaelic personal name Íomhar is a form of the Old Norse personal name Ivarr. Similar surnames or variants include McKeever and McIvor.

Use as a surname

McIver 
 Charles Duncan McIver, American academic
 Don McIver, New Zealand
 Evander McIver, Australian
 Henry McIver, American mercenary
 Hugh McIver, Scottish soldier
 Jock McIver, a stage name of the English music hall performer best known as Talbot O'Farrell (18781952)
 Joel McIver, author
 Kathryn McIver Garcia (born 1970), Commissioner of the New York City Sanitation Department
 Kelie McIver, American actress
 Ken McIver, after whom McIver railway station, in Perth, Australia, is named 
 Margaret McIver (1933–2020), Australian equestrian
 Pearl McIver, American nurse and public official
 Richard McIver, American politician
 Rose McIver, New Zealand actress

MacIver
 Norm Maciver, Canadian sportsman 
 Robert Morrison MacIver, American sociologist
 Stuart MacIver, Scottish footballer

Other uses
 Evander McIver Law (August 7, 1836–October 31, 1920), Confederate general
 Clan MacIver, a Scottish clan

References

Patronymic surnames